Jenny Victoria Palacios-Stillo (born 21 April 1960) is a Honduran cross-country skier.  She represented her country at the 1992 Winter Olympics in Albertville, where she competed in three events: the women's 5 kilometre, women's 15 kilometre and the women's 10 kilometre freestyle pursuit. In each case, she was the last competitor to complete the course; however, since Jenny did in fact finish each event, she finished ahead of the skiers who did not, and thus avoided coming in dead last.

As of 2022, Palacios-Stillo is the only Honduran to compete at a Winter Olympics.

References 
 

1960 births
Living people
Honduran female cross-country skiers
Olympic cross-country skiers of Honduras
Cross-country skiers at the 1992 Winter Olympics